Anastasia Yuryevna Skultan (born February 18, 1984) is a Russian curler from Moscow. She has played in five World Junior Curling Championships (1999, 2000, 2001, 2002 & 2003 [World Junior "B" in 2003]), two European Curling Championships (2000 & 2002), three World Curling Championships (2001, 2002 & 2003) and the 2002 Winter Olympics.

At the Olympics, Skultan played lead position for skip Olga Jarkova. The team finished in last place. Her top result in the World Championships was in 2003, when the team finished in sixth place. The 2003 Winter Universiade Skultan's best tournament; again playing lead for Jarkova, the Russian team won the gold medal defeating Canada's Krista Scharf 11-2 in the final.

References

External links 

1984 births
Living people
Russian female curlers
Curlers from Moscow
Curlers at the 2002 Winter Olympics
Olympic curlers of Russia
Universiade medalists in curling
Universiade gold medalists for Russia
Medalists at the 2003 Winter Universiade